Dan Spencer (born September 10, 1965) is a college baseball coach. He currently serves as the head coach for the Linfield College Wildcats. He previously served as head coach at Green River Community College (1992–1996) and Texas Tech University (2009–2012). He also served as the pitching coach for the New Mexico Lobos and associate head coach/pitching coach for the Washington State Cougars.

Coaching career

Oregon State
Spencer coached at Oregon State for eleven seasons. During his last three years, he was the associate head coach and served as pitching/catching coach and recruiting coordinator. His final two seasons at Oregon State saw the Beavers become the first back-to-back College World Series Champions since LSU accomplished the feat in the late 1990s.

Texas Tech
On July 2, 2007, Spencer was hired as the associate head coach at Texas Tech. In October 2008, Spencer was named the 2007 Collegiate Baseball Magazine National College Pitching Coach of the Year. On April 29, 2008, Texas Tech Athletic Director Gerald Myers designated Spencer to become the head coach of the team once former head coach Larry Hays retired. On June 13, 2008, it was formally announced that Spencer would succeed Larry Hays as head coach at Texas Tech after Hays had announced his retirement a few days earlier.

New Mexico
In July 2012, Spencer was hired as the pitching coach at New Mexico.

Washington State
In June 2015, after the recent hire of new head coach Marty Lees, Spencer was hired as the pitching coach and associate head coach with the Washington State Cougars.

Linfield College 
On June 19, 2019, Spencer was hired as the head baseball coach at Linfield College, an NCAA Division III program.

Head coaching record

References

External links
 Texas Tech profile
 Oregon State profile

1965 births
Living people
New Mexico Lobos baseball coaches
Oregon State Beavers baseball coaches
Texas Tech Red Raiders baseball coaches
Texas Tech Red Raiders baseball players
Green River Gators baseball coaches
MiraCosta Spartans baseball players
Sportspeople from Vancouver, Washington
Washington State Cougars baseball coaches
Tacoma Titans baseball coaches